Reena Kashyap is an Indian politician. She was elected to the Himachal Pradesh Legislative Assembly from Pachhad in the 2019 by election as a member of the Bharatiya Janata Party. By-elections happen due to Suresh Kumar Kashyap elected to Parliament.

References

Living people
Bharatiya Janata Party politicians from Himachal Pradesh
People from Shimla
Himachal Pradesh MLAs 2017–2022
Year of birth missing (living people)